Thomas Turner (born 11 October 1963 in Johnstone, Renfrewshire) is a Scottish former professional footballer.

Career
Turner was captain of the St Mirren side that won the Scottish First Division in 1999–2000. Previous to that he played for Greenock Morton, St Johnstone and Partick Thistle. In his second year at St Mirren, Turner went on a month's loan to Queen of the South after an altercation with supporters of his own team. He finished his professional career with Gretna in 2004.

After leaving senior football he joined the junior leagues to captain his home town team, Johnstone Burgh.

Personal life
Turner's son, Kyle, currently plays as a midfielder for Partick Thistle.

References

External links

1963 births
Living people
Scottish footballers
Greenock Morton F.C. players
St Johnstone F.C. players
St Mirren F.C. players
Queen of the South F.C. players
Gretna F.C. players
Scottish Premier League players
Johnstone Burgh F.C. players
Scottish Football League players
Association football midfielders
People from Johnstone
Partick Thistle F.C. players
Footballers from Renfrewshire